Selorm Adadevoh is a Ghanaian business and technology executive. He is the current chief executive officer of MTN Ghana, a subsidiary of MTN Group. He has worked as a telecommunication, business leader and consultant in Africa, the Caribbean, UK and US.

Early life and education 
Adadevoh had his secondary school education at St. Peter's Boys Senior High School. He holds a Bachelor of science Degree in Civil Engineering from Kwame Nkrumah University of Science and Technology (KNUST), Ghana and a Masters in Business Administration (MBA) in Finance and Strategic Management from The Wharton School of University of Pennsylvania, USA.

Career 
Adadevoh started his career and worked for 10 years as a technology consultant initially for Hewlett-Packard (HP) in the UK, where he served as an advisor to companies like Hutchison 3G, Vodafone, FTSE 100 and later as a Management Consultant at L.E.K. Consulting in the USA where he worked on Mergers, Acquisitions and Private Equity consulting projects for companies like the United Airlines, Jetblue, Procter & Gamble, Pfizer, Laidlaw and many others.

He later moved to Ghana to work as the Chief Commercial Officer (COO) and Head of Mobile Financial Services (MFS) for Tigo (Millicom) Ghana. In his role as COO and Head of the MFS especially, he was responsible in ensuring the boost of the mobile money industry in Ghana in relation to Tigo and other networks as well.

Adadevoh was later appointed as Global Director for Mobile Financial Services (MFS) at Digicel, Haiti in December 2014. He went on to work there for three years rising from his role as Global Director of MFS to COO of Digicel in May 2015 and eventually his rise to CEO of Digicel, Haiti in March 2016, which is the largest of Digicel's 32 operations throughout the world.

In June 2018, Adadevoh was appointed as CEO of MTN Ghana, a subsidiary of MTN Group. He took over from Ebenezer Asante who had been promoted to Ebenezer Asante Vice President of the MTN Group. He was awarded the Marketing Man of the Year 2020 at the 32nd Annual National Marketing Performance Awards organised by the Chartered Institute of Marketing.

Boards and other works 
Adadevoh is a board member of Women's World Banking Ghana (WWBG), Sahel Grains Ltd and Digital Impact Alliance (DIAL) which is funded by the UN Foundation. He is a TEDx fellow, and a member of the African Leadership Network (ALN).

References 

Living people
Ghanaian businesspeople
Ghanaian chief executives
St. Peter's Boys Senior High School alumni
Kwame Nkrumah University of Science and Technology alumni
Year of birth missing (living people)
Ghanaian engineers
Ghanaian business executives
Wharton School of the University of Pennsylvania alumni
Hewlett-Packard people
Adadevoh family